Brian R. James (born 1974) is a game designer and software engineer. As a writer, Brian is best known for his online and print works for the Dungeons & Dragons fantasy role-playing game published by Wizards of the Coast. In game design circles, Brian is highly regarded for his deep knowledge of the Forgotten Realms campaign setting and its extensive history. In 2012 Brian won a Silver ENnie Award for Monster Vault: Threats to the Nentir Vale and he has been nominated for other ENnie Awards and Origins Awards.

Personal life
Brian grew up in Arapahoe County, Colorado and attended Arapahoe High School where he led the computer club and lettered in cross country his senior year.

Writing career 
James got his first big break with the creation of his "Grand History of the Realms" timeline compilation that started in the late 90s. Utilizing his website at the time, he compiled lore from many disparate sources into easily referenced PDFs documents that allowed fans to reference each of his entries. This work eventually caught the eye of senior Wizards of the Coast developers, was purchased by the company and then published as a print sourcebook: The Grand History of the Realms. Since then, James has gone on to co-author (and contribute) to many 4th Edition D&D products, including the award-winning sourcebook Monster Vault: Threats to the Nentir Vale (2011).

He later led the design of Menzoberranzan: City of Intrigue (2012), covering the sinister underdark metropolis famous for birthing the drow Drizzt Do'Urden. James continues to contribute to Dragon and Dungeon magazines; focusing primarily on content for the Forgotten Realms and Planescape fantasy settings.

In 2013 James teamed up with his younger brother Matt James to form Vorpal Games. Their first independent venture is the RED AEGIS Roleplaying Game. A number of artists and designers have been linked to the project, including industry legend Ed Greenwood. RED AEGIS was funded via a Kickstarter campaign in August 2013 that raised $66,254 from 823 backers.

In 2017 James transitioned from tabletop game design into electronic game design, compiling lore for the EverQuest franchise, and the PlanetSide franchise.

Honors 
 2013: Menzoberranzan: City of Intrigue is nominated for an ENnie Award in 3 categories: 
Best Setting, Best Supplement, and Product of the Year.
 2013: Menzoberranzan: City of Intrigue is nominated for Best Roleplaying Supplement by the 39th Annual Origins Awards.
 2012: Monster Vault: Threats to the Nentir Vale wins a Silver ENnie Award for Best Monster/Adversary product.
 2012: Monster Vault: Threats to the Nentir Vale is nominated for Best Roleplaying Supplement or Adventure by the 38th Annual Origins Awards.
 2009: Brian's article Playing Dhampyr (Dragon Magazine #371) is selected to be published in the 2009 Dragon Magazine Annual
 2008: Grand History of the Realms is nominated for Non-Fiction Publication of the Year by the 34th Annual Origins Awards.

Video games

Bibliography

Pathfinder sourcebooks, Paizo Publishing 
 Pathfinder 2E Gamemastery Guide  (2020), designer
 Pathfinder 2E Bestiary 2  (2020), designer
 Giants Revisited  (2012), designer

RED AEGIS sourcebooks, Vorpal Games 
 RED AEGIS Roleplaying Game  (2016), lead designer/publisher

Iron Kingdoms sourcebooks, Privateer Press 
 Iron Kingdoms Unleashed: Wild Adventure  (2016), designer

Dungeons & Dragons sourcebooks, Wizards of the Coast 
 Menzoberranzan: City of Intrigue. (2012), lead designer
 Monster Vault: Threats to the Nentir Vale. (2011), designer - ENnie Award winner
 Demonomicon. (2010), designer
 Underdark. (2010), contributor
 Dragon Magazine Annual. (2009), contributor
 Open Grave: Secrets of the Undead. (2009), designer
 Forgotten Realms Campaign Guide. (2008), designer
 Grand History of the Realms. (2007), lead designer

Magazine articles 
 Corvis Codex: Plagues and Pestilence, No Quarter #52 (2014)
 Ecology of the Modron, Dragon #414 (2012)
 Demonomicon of Iggwilv: Shemeshka the Marauder, Dungeon #205 (2012), co-author
 Chessenta, Dungeon #178 (2010)
 Deities & Demigods: Torog, Dungeon #177 (2010)
 Vaasa, Dungeon #177 (2010)
 Monument of the Ancients, Dungeon #170 (2010), co-author
 Sarifal, Dragon #376 (2009)
 Ecology of the Sharn, Dragon #373 (2009)
 Playing Dhampyr, Dragon #371 (2009)
 Hall of the Frostmaiden, Dragon #367 (2008)
 Cormyr, Dragon #365 (2008)
 Spellplague: The Wailing Years, Dragon #362 (2008)
 Grand History of the Realms: The Moonshaes, Dragon #362 (2008)
 Ironfang Keep, Dragon #361 (2007)
 Age of Sail, Part I, Candlekeep Compendium Volume IX (2007)
 Reign of Dragons, Candlekeep Compendium Volume IV (2005)

Patents 
 Web-based visual development environment, co-inventor

Podcasts 
 The Tome Show 205 Menzoberranzan: City of Intrigue (12/03/2012)
 The Tome Show 178 Monster Vault - Threats to the Nentir Vale (06/30/2011)
 The Tome Show 143 Demonomicon (07/28/2010)

References

External links 
 Realmspace Geonomicon Brian's D&D website
  Spotlight Interview with Brian R. James regarding the Grand History of the Realms
 Questions for Brian R. James message board thread hosted by Candlekeep.com
 Brian James profile on RPG Geek

1974 births
Artists from Philadelphia
Dungeons & Dragons game designers
Living people
People from Arapahoe County, Colorado
Video game writers